The Internazionali di Tennis Città di Parma is a professional tennis tournament played on indoor hard courts. It is part of the Association of Tennis Professionals (ATP) Challenger Tour. It is held in Parma, Italy.

Past finals

Singles

Doubles

See also
Emilia-Romagna Open
Parma Challenger

References

ATP Challenger Tour
Hard court tennis tournaments
Tennis tournaments in Italy